İncirli is a station on the Istanbul Metrobus Bus rapid transit line. It is located on the D.100 state highway, with the entrances/exits on both sides of the road.

İncirli station was opened on 17 September 2007 as part of the original metrobus line.

References

External links
İncirli station
İncirli in Google Street View

Istanbul Metrobus stations
Bahçelievler